Among Angels may refer to:
 "Among Angels" (song), a song by Kate Bush
 Among Angels (book), a book by the actress Jane Seymour